Get Smart's Bruce and Lloyd: Out of Control is a direct-to-video film released in 2008. It is a side spin-off of the 2008 film Get Smart and was released in North America on July 1, 2008, 11 days after the parent film began its theatrical run. Directed by Gil Junger, the film is written by Tom J. Astle and Matt Ember, based upon concepts created for the original Get Smart TV series by Mel Brooks and Buck Henry. The film's DVD sales have passed 100,000 copies with $2.2 million gross.

Plot
This film takes place during the events of Get Smart. Bruce and Lloyd have been testing out an invisibility cloak, but during a party, Maraguayan agent Isabella steals it for El Presidente. Now, Bruce and Lloyd must find the cloak on their own because the only non-compromised agents, Agent 99 and Agent 86 (Max Smart), are in Russia. With no field experience, Bruce and Lloyd must learn how to get a girl and infiltrate the Maraguayan Embassy to prevent Maraguay from selling the cloak to KAOS.

The film includes a cameo by Anne Hathaway as Agent 99 (a scene that makes reference to events in the main film), Terry Crews as Agent 91, and a brief appearance by Patrick Warburton as Hymie. Larry Miller plays a dual role as the "Underchief" in charge of the R&D department, and his twin brother, a CIA official (Miller appears as the CIA official in the theatrical film). The closing credits incorporate bloopers and deleted scenes.

Main cast
 Masi Oka - Bruce
 Nate Torrence - Lloyd
 Jayma Mays - Nina
 Marika Dominczyk - Isabella
 Brianna Rain King as Young Isabella  
 Patrick Warburton - Hymie
 Larry Miller  - The Underchief and his brother
 Ruben Garfias - El Presidente
 Terry Crews - Agent 91
 Amanda Tosch as Agent 34  
 Luisa Moraes as Woman in Dress 
 Regan Burns - Lab Tech
 Kelly Karbacz - Judy the receptionist
 J. P. Manoux - Neil
 Eddie J. Fernandez - Guard
 Matt Kaminsky - C.I.A. Guy (as Matthew Kaminsky)
 Vincent M. Ward - C.I.A Agent
 Ernie Grunwald - Laboratory Worker
 Brian Gattas - Laboratory Worker
 Anne Hathaway - Agent 99  (uncredited cameo)

References

External links
 
 

2008 direct-to-video films
2008 films
2000s Russian-language films
Get Smart films
Film spin-offs
Films directed by Gil Junger
Films produced by Charles Roven
Warner Bros. direct-to-video films
Films about invisibility
2000s spy comedy films
American spy comedy films
2008 comedy films
2000s English-language films
2000s American films